Camille Schumacher (6 May 1896 – 3 August 1977) was a Luxembourgian footballer. He competed in the men's tournament at the 1920 Summer Olympics.

References

External links
 

1896 births
1977 deaths
Luxembourgian footballers
Luxembourg international footballers
Olympic footballers of Luxembourg
Footballers at the 1920 Summer Olympics
Sportspeople from Esch-sur-Alzette
Association football midfielders